Sorrento is an unincorporated settlement located on the south shore of Shuswap Lake in the Southern Interior of the Canadian province of British Columbia. Sorrento is in the Columbia-Shuswap G electoral region of the Columbia-Shuswap Regional District.

History
The name of the townsite was changed from Trapper's Landing to Sorrento by resident J.R. Kinghorn, who saw a physical resemblance between Copper Island, which lies across Shuswap Lake, and the Isle of Capri as seen from the city of Sorrento, Italy.

Festivals
Sorrento hosts the Shuswap Lake Festival of the Arts in July, and the Sorrento Bluegrass Festival in late August.

Climate

References 

Populated places in the Columbia-Shuswap Regional District
Unincorporated settlements in British Columbia
Shuswap Country
Designated places in British Columbia